Niko Havelka (born 17 December 1999) is a Croatian professional footballer who plays as an attacking midfielder for Bistrica.

Club career
Havelka began his football career with local Varaždin making his senior debut for the side in May 2018, as a substitute in a 2–1 win over Hrvatski Dragovoljac in a Croatian Second Football League match. In August 2019, he joined Croatian Third Football League side Podravina on loan until the end of the year. After his return from loan, he joined Slaven Belupo on a permanent deal. On 28 February 2020, Havelka made his professional debut in the Croatian First Football League as a substitute against his former side Varaždin. In summer of 2020, he joined returned to the second division to join Međimurje on a season-long loan deal.

References

External links

Profile at Cyprus FA

1999 births
Living people
Sportspeople from Varaždin
Croatian footballers
Association football midfielders
First Football League (Croatia) players
Croatian Football League players
Second Football League (Croatia) players
Cypriot Second Division players
NK Varaždin (2012) players
NK Slaven Belupo players
NK Međimurje players
Onisilos Sotira players
Croatian expatriate footballers
Croatian expatriate sportspeople in Cyprus
Expatriate footballers in Cyprus
Slovenian Second League players
Expatriate footballers in Slovenia
Croatian expatriate sportspeople in Slovenia